Potosia is a genus of flowering plants from the orchid family, Orchidaceae. It has three known species (as of June 2014), all native to Mexico and Guatemala.

Potosia kusibabiana Szlach., Mytnik & Rutk. - Nuevo León, Distrito Federal de México, Guatemala
Potosia praetermissa Szlach., Mytnik & Rutk. - San Luis Potosí
Potosia tamayoana Szlach., Mytnik & Rutk. - Oaxaca

See also 
 List of Orchidaceae genera

References

External links 

Cranichideae genera
Spiranthinae